Hecht Synagogue is a synagogue located on the Mount Scopus campus of the Hebrew University of Jerusalem.

History
The Hecht synagogue was established by the family of Mayer Jacob "Chic" Hecht (1928-2006), a Republican United States Senator from Nevada and U.S. Ambassador to the Bahamas. It is noted for the unique arrangement of the Torah ark and panoramic view of the Old City of Jerusalem from a huge window. The building was designed by Israeli architect Ram Karmi. Construction was completed in June 1981.

The synagogue overlooks the Temple Mount. The building is constructed of Jerusalem stone with a women's section on the gallery floor. The synagogue does not operate on Sabbath and the Jewish holidays.

See also
Architecture of Israel

References

External links 

Synagogues in Jerusalem
Orthodox synagogues in Israel
Buildings and structures in Central District (Israel)
1981 establishments in Israel
Synagogues completed in 1981
Brutalist architecture in Israel
Jewish organizations established in 1981
Brutalist synagogues